Raw Materials and Residuals is an album by jazz saxophonist Julius Hemphill featuring cellist Abdul Wadud and percussionist Don Moye recorded in 1977 for the Italian Black Saint label.

Reception
The Allmusic review by Michael G. Nastos awarded the album 4 stars calling it "One of the great titles in the modern jazz chronology... a landmark recording in the second wave avant-garde movement of the '70s".

Track listing
All compositions by Julius Hemphill
 "C" - 6:27 
 "Mirrors" - 7:03 
 "Long Rhythm" - 5:00 
 "Plateau" - 8:58 
 "G Song" - 8:23
Recorded at Generation Sound Studios in New York City in November 1977

Personnel
Julius Hemphill - alto saxophone, soprano saxophone
Abdul Wadud - cello
Don Moye - percussion

References 

...

Black Saint/Soul Note albums
Julius Hemphill albums
1977 albums